This is a list of electoral divisions and wards in the ceremonial county of East Riding of Yorkshire in Yorkshire and the Humber. All changes since the re-organisation of local government following the passing of the Local Government Act 1972 are shown. The number of councillors elected for each electoral division or ward is shown in brackets.

Unitary authority councils

East Riding of Yorkshire
Wards from 1 April 1996 (first election 4 May 1995) to 1 May 2003:

Wards from 1 May 2003 to present:

Kingston upon Hull
Wards from 1 April 1974 (first election 7 June 1973) to 5 May 1983:

Wards from 5 May 1983 to 2 May 2002:

Wards from 2 May 2002 to 3 May 2018:

Wards from 3 May 2018 to present:

Former county council

Humberside
Electoral Divisions from 1 April 1974 (first election 12 April 1973) to 7 May 1981:

Electoral Divisions from 7 May 1981 to 1 April 1996 (county abolished):

Former district councils

Boothferry
Wards from 1 April 1974 (first election 7 June 1973) to 6 May 1976:

Wards from 6 May 1976 to 1 April 1996 (district abolished):

East Yorkshire
Wards from 1 April 1974 (first election 7 June 1973) to 6 May 1976:

Wards from 6 May 1976 to 1 April 1996 (district abolished):

East Yorkshire Borough of Beverley
Wards from 1 April 1974 (first election 7 June 1973) to 3 May 1979:

Wards from 3 May 1979 to 1 April 1996 (district abolished):

Holderness
Wards from 1 April 1974 (first election 7 June 1973) to 6 May 1976:

Wards from 6 May 1976 to 1 April 1996 (district abolished):

Electoral wards by constituency

Beverley and Holderness
Beverley Rural (Conservative), Mid Holderness (Conservative), Minster and Woodmansey (Conservative), North Holderness (Conservative), St Mary’s (Liberal Democrats), South East Holderness (Conservative), South West Holderness (Conservative).

Brigg and Goole
Axholme Central, Axholme North, Axholme South, Brigg and Wolds, Broughton and Appleby, Burringham and Gunness, Burton upon Stather and Winterton, Goole North, Goole South, Snaith, Airmyn, Rawcliffe and Marshland.

East Yorkshire
Bridlington Central and Old Town, Bridlington North, Bridlington South, Driffield and Rural, East Wolds and Coastal, Pocklington Provincial, Wolds Weighton.

Haltemprice and Howden
Cottingham North, Cottingham South, Dale, Howden, Howdenshire, South Hunsley, Tranby, Willerby and Kirk Ella.

Kingston upon Hull East
Drypool, Holderness, Ings, Longhill, Marfleet, Southcoates East, Southcoates West, Sutton.

Kingston upon Hull North
Avenue, Beverley, Bransholme East, Bransholme West, Bricknell, Kings Park, Newland, Orchard Park and Greenwood, University.

Kingston upon Hull West and Hessle
Boothferry, Derringham, Hessle, Myton, Newington, Pickering, St Andrew’s.

See also
List of parliamentary constituencies in Humberside

References

Politics of the East Riding of Yorkshire
East Riding of Yorkshire